Edward McGarry may refer to:
Edward McGarry (soldier-politician) (1820–1867), American cavalryman and California legislator
Edward McGarry (Wisconsin politician) (1817–1899), Wisconsin legislator